The Cameron was an automobile manufactured by the Cameron Car Company of Rhode Island from 1902 to 1906, then in Brockton, Massachusetts, from 1906 to 1908, then in Beverly, Massachusetts, from 1909 to 1915, Norwalk, Connecticut, in 1919, and finally in Stamford, Connecticut, in 1920. No cars were produced from 1915 to 1918. The company made two-, four-, and six-cylinder models.

See also
 Brass Era car
 List of defunct United States automobile manufacturers

References

Defunct motor vehicle manufacturers of the United States
Manufacturing companies based in Connecticut
Motor vehicle manufacturers based in Massachusetts
Cars introduced in 1902
1900s cars
1910s cars
American companies established in 1902
Vehicle manufacturing companies established in 1902
Vehicle manufacturing companies disestablished in 1920
1902 establishments in Massachusetts
1920s disestablishments in Connecticut
1920 disestablishments in Massachusetts
Defunct companies based in Connecticut
Defunct companies based in Massachusetts
Beverly, Massachusetts
Companies based in Norwalk, Connecticut
Brass Era vehicles
Veteran vehicles
American companies disestablished in 1920